Kinder Houghton Tucker (25 August 1875 – 24 November 1939) was a cricketer and administrator for Wellington. He played four times for New Zealand in the days before New Zealand played Test cricket.

Born in Nelson, New Zealand, he played 40 first-class cricket matches from 1896 to 1920 and, following his retirement, was the long-serving selector for Wellington. He was the first player to score 10,000 runs in senior club and representative cricket in New Zealand. He was the brother of Spencer Tucker and William Tucker.

Tucker died in Wellington, New Zealand, where he worked as an engraver. He was survived by his wife and their daughter.

Sources
 Whitehorn, Zane "George Orr", The Cricket Statistician, Autumn 2004, No. 127. Association of Cricket Statisticians and Historians: Nottingham.

References

External links

1875 births
1939 deaths
New Zealand cricketers
Pre-1930 New Zealand representative cricketers
Wellington cricketers
North Island cricketers